The Memorial Sea-Hawks are the athletic teams that represent Memorial University of Newfoundland in St. John's, Newfoundland and Labrador, Canada. There are varsity teams in men's and women's basketball, cross-country, soccer, swimming, and volleyball which compete in U Sports. Curling, track and field and wrestling are also available as club sports. 

The University's teams were originally named the Beothuks, after the original inhabitants of Newfoundland, but was changed  in 1990 when that name was deemed inappropriate.

References

External links
 

U Sports teams
Memorial University of Newfoundland
Sport in St. John's, Newfoundland and Labrador
Sports teams in Newfoundland and Labrador